Princess Charming, also known as Alexandra, is a 1934 British musical comedy film directed by Maurice Elvey and starring Evelyn Laye, Henry Wilcoxon, and Yvonne Arnaud. It was made at Islington Studios by Gainsborough Pictures. The film's sets were designed by Ernő Metzner. It is part of the operetta film genre that was popular during the era.

Plot
A Ruritanian princess is betrothed to the king of a neighbouring country, but falls in love with the army officer sent to escort her there. Meanwhile, a revolution breaks out.

Cast

References

Bibliography

External links
 

1934 films
1934 musical comedy films
British black-and-white films
British musical comedy films
Films directed by Maurice Elvey
Films produced by Michael Balcon
Films set in Europe
Gainsborough Pictures films
Islington Studios films
Operetta films
1930s English-language films
1930s British films